Tobi Adegboyega (born 11 November 1980) is a Nigerian pastor. He is the founder of the Salvation Proclaimers Anointed Church (SPAC Nation, eventually known as the NXTION Family), a now defunct pentecostal church formerly based in London, England.

Early life
Tobi Adegboyega moved to London from Lagos, Nigeria in 2005. On arrival in London, he shared a room with his cousin John Boyega, whilst once working as a kitchen porter. They are both Yoruba by tribe.

Career
Adegboyega started his former church SPAC Nation in 2008, with three members. The church was based in Croydon, south London. As pastor, he would encourage criminals to drop their weapons at the altar of his church during services, an act that received both praise and criticism from the public.
On 20 May 2020, Adegboyega reportedly stepped down as Lead Pastor of SPAC Nation and handed over the church to Samuel Akokhia and Damy Balogun, two years prior to its closure. The announcement was then made via the church's official Twitter handle.

Controversies
A BBC Panorama investigation accused Adegboyega and other leaders of the church of financially exploiting members of the church. Panorama interviewed members who made accusations of the church, and suggested Adegboyega be held accountable.

Panorama later released a video of Adegboyega, quoted as saying he believed it was "no big deal for members of the church to give at least £1,000 a month to the church", and that he needed to make £1 million monthly. A member of the church, Nino, claimed he was asked for £20,000 by Adegboyega, who said he needed it for an investment. While the church denied these allegations, Adegboyega declined an interview with Panorama.

In January 2020, his church was accused of financial exploitation and fraud by Croydon North MP Steve Reed, but as of February 2020, the police have said that they would not launch a criminal enquiry.

Many other allegations of financial misappropriation, fraud, domestic abuse, sexual abuse have been raised against his church, SPAC Nation and pastors of the church.

In 2019, SPAC Nation was accused of pressuring youths to sell blood.

In June 2022, Adegboyega's SPAC Nation church was ordered to shut down for good by the U.K. government, after failing to properly account for more than £1.87 million of outgoings and operating with a lack of transparency.

Philanthropy
In 2018, Victoria Derbyshire reported on SPAC Nation and noted that Adegboyega had 14 ex-criminals living with him. It was said that at the release of these convicts from prison, he takes them in, with the aim of making sure they do not fall back to crime. He also encourages former gang members to drop their weapons at the altar during services and gives them new means of life.

In 2019, Adegboyega announced his readiness to alleviate poverty among youths in Lagos State with creation of jobs through the waste management business.

In March 2020, during the COVID-19 pandemic, he sent relief materials to the less deprived, most populated communities and villages in Nigeria, Ghana and Tanzania. The same gesture was replicated in some states of the UK and Europe. He hosted a breakfast with the Financial Times and other leaders present to discuss opportunities available to Nigerian youth.

Personal life
Adegboyega lives in a £2.5 million mansion in Surrey. In a 2020 interview, he stated he had been married for eight years.

References

Nigerian Christian clergy
Nigerian Pentecostal pastors
Living people
1980 births
People from Lagos
Yoruba Christian clergy
People from London
English people of Nigerian descent
English people of Yoruba descent
Residents of Lagos